Vologda Airport  is an airport in Russia located 8 km north of Vologda. It services small airliners.

The airport has the head office of Vologda Aviation Enterprise.

Airlines and destinations

References

External links

 Vologda Aviation Enterprise
  Vologda Aviation Enterprise 

Airports built in the Soviet Union
Airports in Vologda Oblast